Werner Haim (born 21 February 1968) is an Austrian former ski jumper.

Career
In the World Cup he finished 32 times among the top 10, his best result being a victory from Liberec in January 1990. He finished ninth in the overall World Cup that season, as well as in 1993.

He participated in the Ski-Flying World Championships in 1990, 1992 and 1994, his best finish being a seventh place from 1990. He also participated in the FIS Nordic World Ski Championships 1989, placing 38th in the normal hill, 33rd in the large hill and 6th in the team event.

World Cup

Standings

Wins

External links

1968 births
Living people
Austrian male ski jumpers
People from Hall in Tirol
Sportspeople from Tyrol (state)
20th-century Austrian people